Meymand is a city in Fars Province, Iran.

Meymand may also refer to:
 Meymand, Ardabil
 Meymand, Hormozgan
 Meymand, Kerman
 Meymand, Kohgiluyeh and Boyer-Ahmad
 Meymand, Razavi Khorasan
 Meymand Rural District, in Kerman Province
 Meymand, Ghazni in Ghazni Province